"Hexagram" is a song by the American alternative metal band Deftones, and the second single from their eponymous fourth album. The cover art for the single is a work titled "Bandaged Love" by artist Ashley Macomber.

Music video
The black-and-white music video for "Hexagram" showed excited fans entering a building to watch a live performance of the song. As such, the majority of the video focused on this performance, with small exceptions like a shirtless, incapacitated Chino Moreno lying on the floor during the moody bridge. Audio for the video was taken entirely from the studio recording until the very end, which featured live crowd noise.

In contrast to the single's minimal radio play, the "Hexagram" video earned significant rotation on the more underground-oriented Headbangers Ball and Uranium in late 2003.

Reception
In reviewing Deftones, Stephen Thomas Erlewine wrote that "Hexagram", the album's opener, "hits hard—harder than they ever have, revealing how mushy Staind is, or how toothless Linkin Park is".

Covers
In 2010, metalcore band War from a Harlots Mouth recorded a cover of the song.

Track listing
All tracks written by Deftones.
 "Hexagram" – 4:09
 "Bloody Cape" – 3:36
 "Lovers" – 4:11

Charts

References

Deftones songs
2003 singles
Songs written by Chino Moreno
2003 songs
Maverick Records singles
Song recordings produced by Terry Date
Songs written by Stephen Carpenter
Songs written by Chi Cheng (musician)
Songs written by Abe Cunningham
Songs written by Frank Delgado (American musician)